Carlebury (or Carlbury) was launched in 1799 and spent her entire career as a West Indiaman. An American privateer captured her in 1814, but the British Royal Navy recaptured her. She foundered in 1821 with the loss of most of her crew.

Career
Carlebury first appeared in Lloyd's Register in 1800 with W. Johnson, master, Cox & Co., owners, changing to Chisman & Co., and trade Yarmouth.

Capture: Carlebury, Jameson, master, was sailing from Curacao when the American privateer  captured  her on 20 September 1814.  recaptured Carlbury on 29 September 1814.  Lloyd's List reported on 11 October that Carlbury had arrived at Cork after Castilian had recaptured her. Chasseur had plundered Carlbury of her cargo. Carlebury had been carrying cotton, cocoa, hides, 237 seroons (packages) of indigo, etc., and her captors valued the cargo at 50,000 dollars.

A report from Santo Domingo dated 2 January 1818 stated that Captain Tingle had died there a few weeks earlier and that many members of Carleburys crew had deserted. She had loaded on the coast and was going to proceed to Jamaica to gather a crew to take her back to England. The next report was that Carlbury, which had been sailing from Jamaica to Liverpool, had had to put into Charleston, South Carolina, on 24 April in distress. Part of her cargo was 40,000 feet of "prime St Domingo Mahogany".

Fate
Ellen, Campbell, master, rescued the only two survivors and brought them into Liverpool. Carlebury, Chambers (late), master, had been sailing from Saint John, New Brunswick, to Falmouth.

Notes, citations, and references
Notes

Citations

References
 
 

1799 ships
Age of Sail merchant ships of England
Captured ships
Maritime incidents in February 1821